Night Thrasher is a fictional superhero appearing in American comic books published by Marvel Comics. He first appeared in Thor #411 (December 1989), and was created by Tom DeFalco and Ron Frenz.  He is a non-superpowered vigilante, the son of murdered billionaire industrialist parents with ties to the Vietnam War, who uses an advanced suit of body armor, firearms, and a skateboard to battle his foes, and uses the billionaire resources of his family foundation to fund the New Warriors' battle against crime and corruption.

Publication history
Night Thrasher is the founder and leader of the New Warriors, and head of the Taylor Foundation.  Although he possesses no superhuman powers, he has trained himself extensively in many martial arts, and is adept at building technological devices.

In X-Men #29 and X-Force #32, it is revealed that Night Thrasher has ties to the Hellfire Club, a mysterious group of aristocrats and adversaries of the X-Men.

Night Thrasher had two legal guardians when he debuted in the New Warriors' origin issue: Andrew Chord and Tai. Chord has not been seen since mid-volume 1, and Tai died in issue #25 after revealing her plans to use the New Warriors to gain immeasurable power. It is assumed that Night Thrasher has simply outgrown his need for a legal guardian (in the letters page for The New Warriors #39 it was stated that Dwayne was 19 years old).

Fictional character biography

Early life
As a child in New York City, Dwayne Michael Taylor saw his wealthy parents slain before his very eyes. Seeking vengeance, he honed himself into a fighting machine, then became obsessed with the desire to punish all wrongdoers.

He was unable to fully remember the exact circumstances of his parents' deaths, and he was unable to remember the face of their killer; he assumed that this was due to his mind trying to block the memory. Later in life he discovered that the entire circumstances of his parents' death and his own rearing by his guardian Chord and an elderly Asian woman named Tai, had in fact all been orchestrated by Tai herself.

The driven, conflicted young man lived a dual existence: during the day he ran the Taylor Foundation, and at night he relentlessly trained himself to human perfection, studying with the best private tutors money could buy. He then began patrolling the streets of New York City as a crimefighter, to provide a test-bed for his skills.

Early adventures
Silhouette and Midnight's Fire were operating as independent vigilantes in the streets of New York City when they met Dwayne who was doing the same thing but as a solo operative (before he became Night Thrasher). The trio began an organized effort to lessen the influence of New York City street gangs. Silhouette and Midnight's Fire were the children of Andrew Chord who was serving at the time as Dwayne's guardian.

Their partnership ended when Silhouette was shot and paralyzed from the legs down in a sting operation gone badly. Midnight's Fire blamed Dwayne and became a cop killer and a drug lord in order to lure Dwayne into a physical confrontation he could not possibly win. Later the partially paralyzed Silhouette reunited with Dwayne, distancing herself from her brother's evil actions.

Dwayne created a suit of special body armor, partially as a response to the threat of Midnight's Fire who was determined to kill him, and also because he felt it was the most effective way to carry out his mission.

The New Warriors
Night Thrasher meticulously researched several young solo heroes and selected three as targets for recruitment. He based his group on the Fantastic Four, with him being the Reed Richards of the group: the leader and brains. Each additional member was slated to reflect roles of each of the FF.  The first of his recruits was Richard Rider, the retired and supposedly depowered Nova (filling the role of the Thing due to his sheer power).  Deducing he could reignite Rider's powers with a high-stress incident, Night Thrasher abducted Rider and dropped him off a building. Although Rider was understandably upset at Night Thrasher for risking his life, the fact that the incident allowed him to regain his powers (his greatest desire) made him feel obliged to join the team.

Night Thrasher chose the other teammates: mutants Firestar (filling the Human Torch slot) and Marvel Boy, later known as Justice, (filling the Invisible Woman slot). Soon after assembling, the four young superheroes became involved in an emergency. Terrax, a former Herald of Galactus, had re-formed his body and was causing destruction in downtown New York. Arriving at the scene, they found Namorita and Speedball. The six young heroes battled Terrax and neutralized him via the use of ad hoc (but effective) teamwork. In the aftermath, the Avengers arrived and stole the show, leaving some of the young heroes bitter. They agreed to form a new team, the New Warriors, after a label given them by a reporter.

The New Warriors aided Thor in battle against Juggernaut. Night Thrasher's former partnership with Midnight's Fire and Silhouette was revealed, and he defeated Midnight's Fire and was reunited with Silhouette. Night Thrasher first clashed with the Bengal, and fought the Punisher. With the New Warriors and the Fantastic Four, he again battled Terrax. With the New Warriors, he was captured by Gideon.

The Warriors fought crime together fairly successfully for a respectable amount of time, but Dwayne discovered some alarming truths about his life. He learned that his company was involved in shady practices, which led him to unravel lies that he had been fed since childhood. A bizarre mystical conspiracy was revealed involving the Folding Circle, and Tai's true role was made clear.

During this time, Dwayne became the legal guardian for Rage, a young boy in a man's super-powered body. Rage had lost his grandmother in a revenge scheme targeted at the New Warriors' friends and family.

The Folding Circle
Night Thrasher confronted the crime-lord Tatsu'o in Japan, and quit the New Warriors. He battled and was forcibly inducted into the Folding Circle. During this time, Dwayne pretended to join the Folding Circle in order to infiltrate them, but he neglected to tell the Warriors this. His obsession with justice, still fueled by his parents' deaths, and his anger issues led to him leaving the team. He traveled with the Folding Circle to Dragon's Breadth Temple in Cambodia, and learned of Tai's responsibility for his parents' death. With the New Warriors, Darkhawk, and Folding Circle, he thwarted Tai. He sought to prevent a hostile takeover of the Taylor Foundation and saved Chord's life. He fought rematches with Gideon and Bengal, and battled Tantrum.

In the aftermath of his departure, the Warriors were never quite the same. The lineup changed a bit, and Dwayne was an off-again, on-again ally. He suffered setbacks along the way, including losing his girlfriend and teammate Silhouette to his alleged half-brother Donyell (Bandit). Dwayne was also no longer the undisputed leader of the Warriors. Most of the group turned first to Namorita, and then later to Justice for leadership. He later involved himself with Psionex, but eventually returned to the team in the last issues of the volume. He played a prominent role in the final story arc of "The New Warriors", dealing the death stroke to the Dire Wraith Volxx.

In Nova vol. 2 #1 (May 1999), Night Thrasher disbanded the team and decided to travel abroad, training in various martial arts disciplines. Learning of a plot against Iron Fist by the Hand's new leader Junzo Muto during that time, Night Thrasher helped a recently reformed New Warriors in order to save Iron Fist's life. After the adventure, he left again. In the volume's last issue, he returned to the team, so that they could be molded into an effective superhero team again.

New Warriors vol. 3

Dwayne Taylor eventually 'retired' from being a hero, but stayed semi-active while running the Taylor Foundation. He wished to use the foundation to make the world a better place, and became heavily involved in cancer research. He gathered a top notch staff of microbiologists, one of whom developed what appeared to be a cure for cancer. Actually, the cure turned out to have been the work of the biologist's mutant son, who had used his powers to 'tell' the cure what to do. This revelation destroyed investor confidence in the Taylor Foundation. The scientist died trying to prove his cancer cure worked by testing it on himself.

Dwayne salvaged the remains of the Taylor Foundation, and adopted Microbe, the mutant son of the dead microbiologist. Dwayne approached a television production company to bankroll and promote a new team, packaging their adventures as a reality TV show. He reassembled a new team of Warriors, plus Microbe, and they traveled the country.

"Civil War"

Night Thrasher was among the four New Warriors involved in the incident that led to the Superhuman Registration Act in the 2006–2007 storyline Marvel Civil War. The events of the arc began when a group of superheroes including Night Thrasher stakes out a supervillain hideout in the suburbs of Stamford, Connecticut. One of the villains, Nitro, explodes and Night Thrasher dies in the blast. His death is confirmed in Civil War: Front Line #1.

In the aftermath of Civil War, a new team calling themselves the New Warriors have appeared. They began recruiting underground, undiscovered, and de-powered heroes who disagree with the Superhuman Registration Act. While most of these New Warriors are new to the team, the leader and recruiter calls himself as Night Thrasher, though the true identity of this person is unknown for the first few issues. The original Night Thrasher's grave is found to contain only the remains of the costume he was wearing during the Stamford incident, and analysis of the costume reveals little biological material, in contrast to the state of the other victims of the blast. The doctor who performed the analysis explained that Taylor was within close proximity of Nitro's explosion, was only human in contrast to the superhuman status of other New Warriors within the blast proximity, and only partly protected by his costume, but concedes that given the track record for superheroes staying dead, he is only willing to concede that Taylor might be dead but he would not like to "bet the farm" on it. In New Warriors vol. 4 #6, it is revealed that the new Night Thrasher is in fact Donyell Taylor, Dwayne's illegitimate half-brother, previously the villain known as Bandit.

The remains of Dwayne, Microbe and Namorita, are later recovered by the New Warriors and Justice's Counter Initiative team and given a proper burial.

Post "Civil War"
The New Warriors subsequently use a time machine in an attempt to save Dwayne, but are accidentally sent to a future timeline in which Iron Man used the Initiative to place the entire world under a tyrannical reign. Donyell confronts Iron Man and finds that it is not Tony Stark who is wearing the armor, but Dwayne resurrected. Overjoyed that his brother is alive, Donyell helps to capture his own teammates, despite his misgivings about Dwayne's dictatorship. When this alternate Dwayne kills the captive Tony Stark in cold blood, Donyell turns against him, frees the New Warriors and eventually kills him.

"Contest of Champions" and return
During the contest between the Collector and his brother, the Grandmaster, Night Thrasher is pulled out of the timestream seconds before his death so that he may serve as part of the Collector's team. After the Maestro usurps the Collector's role and takes over the contest, Night Thrasher helps lead an insurrection. The rebellion fails, but Maestro sends Night Thrasher back to present day Earth, reasoning that he was too dangerous to keep around. In the present, Night Thrasher awakens to find that his last memory is of dying in the Stamford explosion.

Powers and abilities

Night Thrasher possesses excellent hand-to-hand fighting ability and is trained in various martial arts. He has been able to hold his own against the Punisher and would have beaten him had the Punisher not discharged a submachine gun at point-blank range. He is also an excellent acrobat, a talented designer of battle-suits and small armaments, and a good computer hacker. His strength was enhanced by his Mark II combat armor, but not to a superhuman degree.

According to the villain Genecide, Dwayne has unspecified "advanced DNA". In issue #10 Emma Frost states he was somehow naturally immune to telepathic probes; this was later revealed to have been caused by Tai, either due to her tampering with his memory or a deliberate effort on Tai's part to ensure that no one else could manipulate Dwayne and interfere with her plans for him.

Equipment
Night Thrasher wore a special suit of light articulated combat armor composed of Kevlar/borosilicate fiber in a ceramic matrix and 8 mm and 16 mm thick layers of micro-mail titanium nitride. He designed the battle-suit to survive physical combat with Silhouette's brother Midnight's Fire. The costume cannot be penetrated by conventional bullets or knives and is fireproof. The suit includes a wafer-thin L.E.D. casing that allows the suit to camouflage itself within its surroundings. The helmet contained integral goggles with infrared sighting, telescopic lenses, magnetic resonance scanning, and a camera attachment. It also includes a breathing apparatus, voice scrambler, two-way radio communications device, parabolic sound enhancer, and a cybernetic link to armor systems.

He carried a pair of truncheons, Escrima sticks which he called his "Battle Staves" which attached to special slots in the back of the Mark I armor, and an armored high tech fiberglass skateboard with a retractable razor-sharp blade. The board also hooked onto the back of his armor. The armor was equipped with a titanium spring-lock blade in the right forearm. The left wrist contained a thin adamantium alloy garrote wire. Micro surface-to-surface (STS) missiles were also mounted on the forearms. The Mark I armor also had a hidden compartment in which he had a Micro Uzi submachine pistol stored for emergencies. His skateboard could also be used as a shield or as a weapon and could be modified for use as a snowboard.

The wrist gauntlets on his armor could fire pepper spray, sleeping gas or explosively launch his "Battle Staves" which were holstered alongside his forearms in the Mark II armor. His gauntlets could also deploy pneumatically-fired grapnel lines for traversing rooftops, and contained retractable blades and an extendable computer tap. He also had a utility pack with various shaped explosives, plastique, napalm gel, and cordite packs, magnesium flares, smoke capsules, incendiary packs, caltrops/spur jacks, and ball bearings. The back pack also contained a glider chute. The Mark II armor also had an advanced active camouflage system.

The Night Thrasher armor Dwayne was wearing in Civil War was made from a vibranium mesh.

Merchandise 
Various items have been marketed featuring Night Thrasher (Dwayne Taylor).  In November 2006 Wizkids marketed through their Supernova line a Night Thrasher HeroClix figurines (set of 3).  Night Thrasher was featured in Marvel Universe Trading Cards – Series 1 (1990, card #85), Series 2 (1991, cards #22 and 156), Series 3 (1992, cards #59 and 174), Series 4 (1993, card #26), and Series 5 (1994, cards #79 and 168).  Night Thrasher was also included in a number of T-shirts, posters, and art prints featuring New Warriors.

Night Thrasher received a figure in the Marvel Legends Kingpin wave in early 2019. It came with his skateboard, black versions of Daredevil's billy clubs, a weapons mount for his back, and Kingpin's left leg.

In other media

Television
 A Night Thrasher TV series was in early stages of development for UPN in 2002, but it did not materialize.
 Night Thrasher was set to appear in the  New Warriors TV series played by Jeremy Tardy before it was cancelled.

Video games 
 Night Thrasher was added to the mobile game Marvel: Contest of Champions.

References

External links
World of Black Heroes: Dwayne Taylor Biography
Marvel.com: Night Thrasher

African-American superheroes
Characters created by Ron Frenz
Characters created by Tom DeFalco
Comics characters introduced in 1989
Fictional businesspeople
Fictional characters from New York City
Marvel Comics martial artists
Marvel Comics superheroes
Vigilante characters in comics